The 2012–13 A-League National Youth League was the fifth season of the Australian A-League National Youth League competition. The season ran in parallel with the 2012–13 A-League season. The new Western Sydney Wanderers played their inaugural season in the league, replacing the defunct Gold Coast United team.

Teams

Managerial changes

Standings

Fixture and results
Round 1

Round 2

Round 3

Round 4

Round 5

Round 6

Brisbane fielded ineligible players, CCM retrospectively awarded a 3–0 win. Original result was 0–1

Round 7

Round 8

Round 9

Round 10

Round 11

Round 12

Round 13

Round 14

Round 15

Round 16

Round 17

Round 18

Top goalscorers
Updated to end of round 17

References

External links
Official NYL website

2012–13 A-League season
A-League National Youth League seasons